is a passenger railway station in located in the city of Kuwana, Mie Prefecture, Japan, operated by Central Japan Railway Company (JR Tōkai).

Lines
Nagashima Station is served by the Kansai Main Line, and is 19.6 rail kilometers from the terminus of the line at Nagoya Station.

Station layout
The station consists of one island platform, with no station building. The station is unattended.

Platform

Adjacent stations

|-
!colspan=5|Central Japan Railway Company (JR Central)

Station history
Nagashima Station was opened on November 11, 1899 as a station on the Kansai Railway. The Kansai Railway was nationalized on October 1, 1907 becoming part of the Japanese Government Railways (JGR). The JGR became the Japan National Railways (JNR) after World War II. The station has been unattended since October 1, 1970. The station was absorbed into the JR Central network upon the privatization of the JNR on April 1, 1987.

Station numbering was introduced to the section of the Kansai Main Line operated JR Central in March 2018; Nagashima Station was assigned station number CI06.

Passenger statistics
In fiscal 2019, the station was used by an average of 570 passengers daily (boarding passengers only).

Surrounding area
Nagashima Castle ruins
Kuwana City Nagashima Town General Branch
Kintetsu Nagashima Station

See also
 List of railway stations in Japan

References

External links

Railway stations in Japan opened in 1899
Railway stations in Mie Prefecture
Kuwana, Mie